Quentin James Lake (born January 29, 1999) is an American football safety for the Los Angeles Rams of the National Football League (NFL). He played college football at UCLA.

Lake is the son of former NFL player Carnell Lake.

Professional career

Lake was drafted by the Los Angeles Rams with the 211th pick in the sixth round of the 2022 NFL Draft. He was placed on the reserve/PUP list to start the 2022 season. He was activated from the reserve/PUP list on November 12, 2022.

References

External links
 Los Angeles Rams bio
 UCLA Bruins bio

1999 births
American football safeties
Living people
Players of American football from California
UCLA Bruins football players
Los Angeles Rams players